Simone Parodi (born 16 June 1986) is an Italian volleyball player, former member of the Italy men's national volleyball team, bronze medalist of the Olympic Games London 2012, World League (2013, 2014) and silver medalist of the 2013 European Championship. On club level, he plays for Italian team Prisma Volley.

Sporting achievements

Clubs
 CEV Cup
  2009/2010 – Bre Banca Lannutti Cuneo
 National championships
 2005/2006  Italian Cup, with Bre Banca Lannutti Cuneo
 2009/2010  Italian Championship, with Bre Banca Lannutti Cuneo
 2010/2011  Italian SuperCup, with Bre Banca Lannutti Cuneo
 2010/2011  Italian Cup, with Bre Banca Lannutti Cuneo
 2011/2012  Italian Championship, with Lube Banca Marche Macerata
 2012/2013  Italian SuperCup, with Cucine Lube Banca Marche Macerata
 2013/2014  Italian Championship, with Cucine Lube Banca Marche Macerata
 2014/2015  Italian SuperCup, with Cucine Lube Banca Marche Treia
 2019/2020  Polish SuperCup, with Grupa Azoty ZAKSA Kędzierzyn-Koźle

References

External links
 
 Player profile at Olympic.org
 Player profile at LegaVolley.it
 Player profile at PlusLiga.pl
 Player profile at Volleybox.net

1986 births
Living people
People from Sanremo
Italian men's volleyball players
Olympic volleyball players of Italy
Olympic medalists in volleyball
Olympic bronze medalists for Italy
Medalists at the 2012 Summer Olympics
Volleyball players at the 2012 Summer Olympics
Italian expatriate sportspeople in Poland
Expatriate volleyball players in Poland
Blu Volley Verona players
ZAKSA Kędzierzyn-Koźle players
Resovia (volleyball) players
Sportspeople from the Province of Imperia